Leszek Tórz (born 12 April 1959) is a Polish field hockey player. He competed in the men's tournament at the 1980 Summer Olympics.

References

External links
 

1959 births
Living people
Polish male field hockey players
Olympic field hockey players of Poland
Field hockey players at the 1980 Summer Olympics
Sportspeople from Poznań